Çufo is an Albanian TV channel for children from 1–14 years old. The rating system is divided into 3 groups: babies from 1–5 years old, kids from 6–9 years old, and preteens and teenagers from 11–14 years old. It was launched on December 18, 2006 by the TV platform DigitAlb.

All of the channel's content is dubbed into Albanian, although the programs leave songs in their original language but with Albanian subtitles. The audio track can be switchable to the original language of dubbing as well; a similar system to SAP. A few shows on the channel are Albanian original.

The channel airs promos featuring its mascot, four letters modeled after a pig that spell the word Çufo. The title and the music of the channel are based on a famous 1982 Albanian cartoon, Ndodhitë e Çufos (Çufo's events). No commercials or promos are shown between shows, but rather after them.

Currently, the majority of the programming that is not movies is legally broadcast on the channel, like its sister channel, Bang Bang. In the past, they have broadcast mostly illegally dubbed cartoons; some of the illegally-dubbed cartoons and other children's series still currently air, as Çufo rotates the shows it airs each month to ensure that programs both old and new continue to have opportunities to air.

Programming

Programs

Çufo airs a mix of animated and live-action programming dubbed in Albanian by "Jess" Discographic, AA Film Company, NGS Recording, Top Channel, Albatrade Studio and Albania Production (Unison).

See also
 DigitAlb
 Television in Albania

References

External links
Official Website
Channel and transponder list

Digitalb television networks
Mass media in Tirana
Television channels and stations established in 2006
Television channels in Albania
Television stations in Kosovo
Television channels in North Macedonia